Matthew Trott may refer to:

 Matthew Trott (footballer) (born 1985), Australian goalkeeper
 Matthew Trott (rower) (born 1980), New Zealand rower